Inglott is a surname. Notable people with this surname include:
.
Anton Inglott (1915–1945), Maltese painter. 
Wenceslao Benítez Inglott (1879–1955), Spanish navy officer, scientist, and engineer. Director of the Naval Military Academy and of the Royal Institute and Observatory of the Spanish Navy.
Rafael Acosta Inglott (1889–1941), Professor of Law at the universities of Oviedo and Granada and mayor of the Spanish city of Granada (1940–1941).
Cayetano Bernardo Inglott y Durán (1795–1875), Businessman and the seventh mayor of the Spanish city of Las Palmas de Gran Canaria (1835–1837). 
Peter Serracino Inglott (1936–2012), Rector of the University of Malta, linguist and author.
Jerome Inglott (1776–1835), Maltese philosopher and theologian.
William Inglott (1553–1621), English organist and composer.
Martin Cauchi Inglott (born 1967), Maltese senior retired Armed Forces of Malta officer, diplomat and the current secretary general of the Democratic Party.

Note